Michigan's 8th Senate district is one of 38 districts in the Michigan Senate. The current senator for the district is Mallory McMorrow of Royal Oak.

Geography
District 8 encompasses parts of Oakland and Wayne counties.

2011 Apportionment Plan
District 8, as dictated by the 2011 Apportionment Plan, was based in northern and coastal Macomb County to the north of Detroit, including the communities of St. Clair Shores, Harrison Township, Mount Clemens, Chesterfield Township, New Baltimore, Lenox Township, New Haven, Ray Township, Utica, Shelby Township, Washington Township, Romeo, and Bruce Township.

The district overlapped with Michigan's 9th and 10th congressional districts, and with the 18th, 24th, 30th, 31st, 32nd, 33rd, and 36th districts of the Michigan House of Representatives.

Recent election results

2021

2018

2014

Federal and statewide results in District 8

Historical district boundaries

References 

8
Macomb County, Michigan